The Jolly Waggoner (Roud # 1088) is an English folk-song.

Synopsis
A waggoner looks back on his life. His parents had disapproved of his choice of profession, but has no regrets. He can be cold and wet, but he simply stops at the next inn and  sits with the landlord, drinking. In the summer he hears the birds sing. In the autumn he has lots of work and the money rolls in. What a jolly life!

Lyrics
These lyrics are those used by The Yetties in their adaptation of this song from their 1997 album Folk Music of England.

When first I went a-waggoning, a-waggoning did go
It filled me poor old parents' hearts with sorrow, grief and woe
And many were the hardships that I did undergo

Chorus:
Sing woah, me lads, sing woah
Drive on, my lads, drive on
Who wouldn't be for all the world a jolly waggoner?

It is a cold and stormy night, I'm wet near to me skin
But I'll bear it with contentment until I get to the inn
And there I'll sit a-drinking with the landlord and his kin

Chorus

Now summer is a-coming on, what pleasures we shall see!
The small birds they'll be singing high up on every tree
The blackbirds and the thrushes, a-whistling merrily

Chorus

Now Michaelmas is coming on, what pleasures we shall see!
I'll make the gold to fly, me boys, like chaff before the breeze!
And every lad shall take his lass and sit her on his knee

Chorus

Well things is greatly altered now since wagons here was seen
The world's turned topsy-turvy, lads, and things is run by steam!
And the whole world passes before me just like a morning dream

Chorus (x2)

Commentary
Several websites say "This country song could date back to the time when waggons replaced packhorses". Most versions refer to the arrival of steam
"The world's turned topsy-turvy lads and things, is run by steam"
A date in the early nineteenth century therefore seems much more sensible than the eighteenth century. In the early nineteenth century only the rich could afford to travel long distances. Most people would rarely travel more than a few miles from their house. This goes some way to explaining why the waggoner takes so much pleasure in travelling the countryside. The roadbuilding that took place in the late 18th century made travelling in a wheeled vehicle much more pleasurable. Those who were first to transport goods by road would make a quick profit. The waggoner can laugh at his parents for failing to spot this business opportunity.

Historical background
Ralph Vaughan Williams collected it from Edward Rose, landlord of the Bridge public house at Acle, Norfolk on Tuesday 14 April 1908. Alfred Williams collected it from David Sawyer of Ogborne, Upper Thames. Sabine Baring-Gould and Cecil Sharp also collected it. The distribution of the song appears to be confined to England, though an early broadsheet version comes from Dublin. Some sources say it is particularly popular in the west of England, though Kidson found it in Yorkshire, and Robert Bell found in Tyne and Wear.

Cultural relationships
As with most occupational folk songs, it is full of praise for his chosen way of life, and totally upbeat. This would be an ideal song for a traveller using a horse-drawn caravan, but there is no history of any traveller including it in his repertoire.

Standard references
 Roud 1088

Broadsides
J. F. Nugent and Co (Dublin) (1860–1899)

Other printed versions

"Ancient Poems, Ballads and Songs of the Peasantry of England" ed by Robert Bell (1857)
 Frank Kidson found it in Yorkshire
 "A Garland of Country Songs" by S Baring Gould and H Fleetwood Shepherd (probably collected between 1888 and 1917)
(Sabing Baring-Gould noted it from James Oliver of Launceton)
Alfred Williams "Folk songs of the Upper Thames" song dated c 1914-16
"Twice 44 Sociable Songs" by Geoffrey Shaw (1928)
"The Oxford Song Book" vol 2 (1963)
"Everyman's Book of English Country Songs" ed by Roy Palmer. (1979)

Recordings

There are many pubs called "Jolly Waggoner", for example
- Ardley, Hertfordshire
- Hounslow, Middlesex

References

External references
The Other Pages
mp3

English folk songs
19th-century songs
Year of song unknown